Lacinutrix himadriensis is a Gram-negative, rod-shaped, psychrophilic and non-motile bacterium from the genus of Lacinutrix.

References 

Flavobacteria
Bacteria described in 2013